Literary Wonderlands: A Journey Through the Greatest Fictional Worlds Ever Created is a 2016 book edited by Laura Miller, co-founder of Salon.com. It is a compendium of "lands that exist only in the imagination," and covers 2,000 years of literary creation. For each work, an entry provides historical context, plot summary, and author biography.

The contents are divided into five chronological sections covering the following works:

Ancient Myth & Legend

The Epic of Gilgamesh, c.1750 BCE
The Odyssey, c.725-675 BCE Homer
Metamorphoses, c.8 Ovid
Beowulf, c.700-1100
The Thousand and One Nights, c.700-947
The Mabinogion, 12th-14th century
The Prose Edda, c.1220 Snorri Sturluson
The Divine Comedy, c.1308-21 Dante Alighieri
Le Morte d'Arthur, 1485 Thomas Malory

Orlando Furioso, c.1516/32 Ludovico Ariosto
Utopia, 1516 Thomas More
The Faerie Queene, 1590-1609 Edmund Spenser
Journey to the West (Xiyouji), c.1592 Wu Cheng'en
The City of the Sun, 1602 Tommaso Campanella
Don Quixote, 1605/15 Miguel de Cervantes
The Tempest, 1611 William Shakespeare
A Voyage to the Moon, 1657 Cyrano de Bergerac
The Description of a New World, called The Blazing-World, 1666 Margaret Cavendish

Science & Romanticism

Gulliver's Travels, 1726 Jonathan Swift
The Journey of Niels Klim to the World Underground, 1741 Ludvig Holberg
The Water-Babies: A Fairy Tale for a Land Baby, 1863 Charles Kingsley
Alice's Adventures in Wonderland, 1865 Lewis Carroll
Twenty Thousand Leagues Under the Sea, 1870 Jules Verne
Erewhon, 1872 Samuel Butler
The Ring of the Nibelung, 1876 Richard Wagner

Treasure Island, 1883 Robert Louis Stevenson
Flatland: A Romance of Many Dimensions, 1884 Edwin A. Abbott
Looking Backward: 2000-1887, 1888 Edward Bellamy
A Connecticut Yankee in King Arthur's Court, 1889 Mark Twain
The Time Machine, 1895 H. G. Wells
The Wonderful Wizard of Oz, 1900 L. Frank Baum

Golden Age of Fantasy

Peter Pan in Kensington Gardens, 1906 J. M. Barrie
The Lost World, 1912 Arthur Conan Doyle
At the Earth's Core, 1914 Edgar Rice Burroughs
Herland, 1915 Charlotte Perkins Gilman
Tales of Snugglepot and Cuddlepie: Their Adventures Wonderful, 1918 Cecilia May Gibbs
We, 1924 Yevgeny Zamyatin
The Castle, 1926 Franz Kafka
The Cthulhu Mythos, 1928-37 H. P. Lovecraft

Brave New World, 1932 Aldous Huxley
Conan the Barbarian, 1932-36 Robert E. Howard
Alamut, 1938 Vladimir Bartol
Tlón, Uqbar, Orbis Tertius, 1941 Jorge Luis Borges
Islandia, 1942 Austin Tappan Wright
The Little Prince, 1943 Antoine de Saint-Exupéry
The Moomins and the Great Flood, 1945 Tove Jansson

New World Order

Gormenghast, 1946-59 Mervyn Peake
Nineteen Eighty-Four, 1949 George Orwell
The Chronicles of Narnia, 1950-56 C. S. Lewis
I, Robot, 1950 Isaac Asimov
Fahrenheit 451, 1953 Ray Bradbury
The Lord of the Rings, 1954-55 J. R. R. Tolkien
Pedro Páramo, 1955 Juan Rulfo
Solaris, 1961 Stanisław Lem
A Clockwork Orange, 1962 Anthony Burgess
Pale Fire, 1962 Vladimir Nabokov
Planet of the Apes, 1963 Pierre Boulle
One Hundred Years of Solitude, 1967 Gabriel García Márquez
A Wizard of Earthsea, 1968 Ursula K. Le Guin

Do Androids Dream of Electric Sheep?, 1968 Philip K. Dick
The Last Unicorn, 1968 Peter S. Beagle
Slaughterhouse-Five, 1969 Kurt Vonnegut
Ringworld, 1970 Larry Niven
Invisible Cities, 1972 Italo Calvino
The Princess Bride, 1973 William Goldman
Dhalgren, 1975 Samuel R. Delany
W or the Memory of Childhood, 1975 Georges Perec
Egalia's Daughters: A Satire of the Sexes, 1977 Gerd Mjøen Brantenberg
The Bloody Chamber and Other Stories, 1979 Angela Carter
Kindred, 1979 Octavia E. Butler
The Hitchhiker's Guide to the Galaxy, 1979 Douglas Adams

The Computer Age

The Dark Tower series, 1982-2012 Stephen King
The Discworld series, 1983-2015 Terry Pratchett
Neuromancer, 1984 William Gibson
The Handmaid's Tale, 1985 Margaret Atwood
The Culture series, 1987-2012 Iain M. Banks
Obabakoak, 1988 Bernardo Atxaga
The Sandman, 1988-2015 Neil Gaiman et al.
Snow Crash, 1992 Neal Stephenson
The Giver, 1993 Lois Lowry
His Dark Materials, 1995-2000 Philip Pullman
A Game of Thrones, 1996 George R. R. Martin
Infinite Jest, 1996 David Foster Wallace
Harry Potter and the Philosopher's Stone, 1997 J. K. Rowling
The Bas-Lag cycle, 2000-04 China Miéville

The Eyre Affair, 2001 Jasper Fforde
Inkheart, 2003 Cornelia Funke
Jonathan Strange & Mr. Norrell, 2004 Susanna Clarke
Cloud Atlas, 2004 David Mitchell
Never Let Me Go, 2005 Kazuo Ishiguro
Wizard of the Crow, 2006 Ngũgĩ wa Thiong'o
The Yiddish Policemen's Union, 2007 Michael Chabon
The Hunger Games, 2008 Suzanne Collins
1Q84, 2009-10 Haruki Murakami
The Man with the Compound Eyes, 2011 Wu Ming-Yi
The Imperial Radch trilogy, 2013-15 Ann Leckie
Lagoon, 2014 Nnedi Okorafor
Two Years Eight Months and Twenty-Eight Nights, 2015 Salman Rushdie

Critical response
Reviewing the book in The Sydney Morning Herald, Steven Carroll declared that "the sweep is impressive." Andrew Sean Greer, writing in The New York Times, found that the book "does its job admirably: succinctly describing each work in detail and providing enough illustrations to inspire delight." However, he found wide variability in quality among contributors, and he questioned the arbitrary choice of works to include. Alec Scott, writing in The Globe and Mail, faulted the book for not explaining the kinship between fantasy and science-fiction genres, and for its inclusion of "schlock" along with truly literary works. Kirkus Reviews said the book features "an encyclopedia’s breadth and lack of depth."

See also
The Dictionary of Imaginary Places
An Atlas of Fantasy

References

2016 non-fiction books
Encyclopedias of fictional worlds